Jimusaria is an extinct genus of dicynodont therapsid from the Late Permian (Changhsingian) Guodikeng Formation (Jilicao Group) of China. The type species J. sinkianensis was originally named as a species of Dicynodon, the first from Asia, but was given its own genus in 1963 before being sunk back into Dicynodon in 1988. The genus was resurrected in 2011 by palaeontologist Christian Kammerer in a taxonomic revision of the genus Dicynodon. Jimusaria was a mid-sized dicynodont, and was similar in appearance to the South African Dicynodon, but differed from it in features such as its narrower snout.

References

Further reading 

 A.-l. Sun. 1973. [Permo-Triassic dicynodonts from Turfan, Sinkiang]. Reports of Paleontological Expedition to Sinkiang (I): Permo-Triassic Vertebrate Fossils of Turfan Basin. Memoirs of the Institute of Vertebrate Paleontology and Paleoanthropology Academia Sinica 10:53-68
 P. L. Yuan and C. C. Young. 1934. On the discovery of a new Dicynodon in Sinkiang. Bulletin of the geological Society of China 13(1):563-574

Dicynodonts
Anomodont genera
Permian synapsids of Asia
Lopingian genus extinctions
Changhsingian
Fossils of China
Paleontology in Xinjiang
Fossil taxa described in 1973